Otto von Fürth (18 November 1867 – 7 June 1938) was an Austrian physician, physiologist and biochemist. Fürth studied at the University of Prague, the University of Heidelberg and the University of Berlin. He worked at the University of Vienna, the University of Prague and the University of Straßburg where received his habilitation in medical chemistry in 1899. From that point on he worked in Vienna focusing on biochemistry. In 1898 he announced the discovery of "suprerenin." He received the Lieben Prize in 1923.

References

1867 births
Austrian physiologists
Austrian chemists
Czech Technical University in Prague alumni
1938 deaths
Austrian biochemists
Austrian physicians
University of Vienna